FC Kutubu was a semi-professional association football club based in the Hekari Province near Kutubu, Papua New Guinea. The club was founded in 2019, and was the parent club of Aporo Mai FC.

The club took part in the 2019–20 Papua New Guinea National Soccer League, finishing last.

History 
The club was founded in 2019, and became the first club to join the new 2019–20 season of the Papua New Guinea National Soccer League. It was later revealed that the club is under the same management as Aporo Mai FC, which took part in the 2019 National Soccer League, and that FC Kutubu would act as the parent club for Aporo Mai.

The club played their first match at their "home" for the season, the National Sports Institute in Goroka. They defeated Morobe Wawens 1–0 thanks to a goal from Andrew Apo. However, despite a second win against Star Mountain in the fourth round of fixtures, with Apo hitting a hat-trick, the side found themselves second-from-bottom at the halfway stage of the season, having suffered heavy defeats to the likes of Tusbab Stallions (0–5) and Lae City (1–8).

The side started the second half of the season relatively strongly, picking up four points from their opening three matches, including a 4–3 victory over Gulf Komara, but could only manage one more point in their remaining fixtures, finishing bottom of the table with 11 points.

Domestic record

National Competitions 

 Papua New Guinea National Soccer League
 2019–20: 10th

References 

Football clubs in Papua New Guinea
Association football clubs established in 2019